Munida gregaria, commonly known as the gregarious squat lobster, is a species of squat lobster found along the eastern seaboard of the South Island of New Zealand, around the southern coast of Tasmania and in a few locations around the southern parts of South America and Tierra del Fuego.

Taxonomy and nomenclature 
The species was first described from Patagonia by Johan Christian Fabricius in 1793.

A study of population samples from New Zealand and from the Tierra del Fuego region indicate they are the same species, despite the large distance and deep ocean between these locations.

Its specific epithet (gregaria) derives from its behaviour in the immature phase to form very large shoals or swarms of many tens of thousands of individuals in shallow coastal waters. This can result in mass strandings.

Munida gregaria is sometimes referred to as lobster krill because it looks like a baby lobster and is found in swarms near the surface like krill.

Habitat and distribution 
In South America, the species has been identified in Chile, and the Strait of Magellan.

In New Zealand, Munida gregaria is most commonly found along the east coast of the South Island, particularly around Banks Peninsula and Otago .  However, they have also been observed in Milford Sound, are occasionally seen around the southern parts of Cook Strait and the beaches of Nelson.   They generally live along coastlines where there is a mixing of coastal and oceanic waters to provide a sufficiently rich supply of food.

There are many species of squat lobster, but M. gregaria is unusual in that it is only one of a very few of the Munida species that aggregate in large swarms.

In New Zealand waters, the larvae of M. gregaria undergo 5 stages of larval development from mid-winter until the postlarval metamorphosis in spring, when they form large swarms on the surface and heaped up on beaches. They come inshore in large numbers during this phase of their life-cycle, seeking suitable habitat. The post-larval stage typically lasts until February when the animals begin the benthic phase of their life-cycle and settle on the sea floor. Adults that settle on the bottom may live for 2 or 3 years.

References

External links 
 
 Munida gregaria discussed on RNZ Critter of the Week, 15 July 2022

Squat lobsters
Crustaceans of the Atlantic Ocean
Crustaceans of the Indian Ocean
Crustaceans of the Pacific Ocean
Crustaceans described in 1793
Taxa named by Johan Christian Fabricius